Raadhika Sarathkumar is an Indian actress, entrepreneur, producer and politician who works predominantly in Tamil cinema along with Telugu cinema as well as a few Malayalam, Hindi and Kannada films. She is the founder and CP of the Radaan Mediaworks India Limited and doing serials in most of the south Indian languages. and is a recipient of six Filmfare Awards South, two Nandi Awards and three Tamil Nadu State Film Awards.

Personal life
Raadhika is the daughter of the late Tamil film actor and comedian, M. R. Radha who hailed from Tamil Nadu and Geetha who is a Sri Lankan.  Raadhika did her education in India, Sri Lanka and the United Kingdom. She has a younger sister Nirosha, who is also an actress, and two younger brothers, Raju and Mohan. She also  has an older half-brother  Radha Ravi.

Raadhika married actor Sarathkumar on 4 February 2001. They had been friends before their marriage and had been paired in two films: Namma Annachi (1994) and Suryavamsam (1997). The couple has a son named Rahul born in 2004.

Her daughter Rayane Hardy married Cricketer Abhimanyu Mithun in 2016. Raadhika became a grandmother in 2018 when Rayane had a son.

Film career

She made her cinematic debut in 1978 Tamil Movie Kizhakke Pogum Rail. Then she started acting in many Tamil, Telugu, Kannada, Hindi and Malayalam films.

She has also produced a film titled Meendum Oru Kaathal Kathai (1985), which won the Indira Gandhi Award for Best Debut Film of a Director.

She was awarded Best Telugu Actress for Nyayam Kavali (1981), Best Tamil Actress for Dharma Devathai (1986), Neethikku Thandanai (1987) and Keladi Kanmani (1990).

After becoming successful in cinema, Raadhika wanted to do something different and decided to take on the small screen, a venture that everyone thought was a mistake she would regret. But determined to pursue something she believed in, namely producing her own TV software under the Radaan Mediaworks, she started the same in 1994. After some initial hiccups, the company re-emerged successfully as Radaan Mediaworks (I) Ltd in 1999, and by 2008, had an annual turnover exceeding.

She was a judge on Vijay TV's Jodi Number One Season 4.

She produced serials such as Idi Katha Kadu (Telugu), Chitti, Annamalai, Selvi, Arasi, Chellamay, Vani Rani, Thamarai and Chithi - 2.

In September 2019, she was awarded as "Nadigavel Selvi"  during audio launch of Market Raja MBBS.

She has won 1 - National Film Awards (Producer), 6 - Filmfare Awards Souths , 3 - Tamil Nadu State Film Awards, 1 - Cinema Express Awards  and 1 - Nandi Awards.

Political career
She joined before the 2006 Assembly elections to join the AIADMK along with her husband R. Sarathkumar. On 18 October 2006, she was dismissed from AIADMK for anti-party activities. She was the vice president of All India Samathuva Makkal Katchi from 2007.

Awards and nominations

Filmography

References

External links 
 

Living people
Actresses in Malayalam cinema
Actresses in Hindi cinema
Actresses in Kannada cinema
Actresses in Tamil cinema
Actresses in Telugu cinema
Actresses in Telugu television
Filmfare Awards South winners
Indian film actresses
Indian television actresses
Nandi Award winners
Tamil Nadu State Film Awards winners
20th-century Indian actresses
21st-century Indian actresses
Actresses from Chennai
Tamil film producers
Telugu film producers
Indian women film producers
Film producers from Chennai
Businesswomen from Tamil Nadu
20th-century Indian businesswomen
20th-century Indian businesspeople
21st-century Indian businesswomen
21st-century Indian businesspeople
Producers who won the Best Debut Feature Film of a Director National Film Award
Actresses in Tamil television
Place of birth missing (living people)
1963 births
Indian people of Sri Lankan descent
Tamil television producers